Cirie Tiffany Fields (born July 18, 1970) is an American nurse and reality TV personality who competed on four seasons of Survivor. She first appeared in 2006 on Survivor: Panama, finishing in 4th place. In 2008, she returned and placed 3rd on Survivor: Micronesia. She made her third appearance on Survivor: Heroes vs. Villains in 2010, finishing 17th after being targeted and blindsided early in the game. She made her fourth and final appearance on Survivor: Game Changers, where she finished 6th and was eliminated without receiving a vote.

She is widely considered one of the greatest Survivor players of all-time, with some even calling her the best to never win.

Early life 
Fields was born on July 18, 1970 in Jersey City, New Jersey. She grew up partially in Norwalk, Connecticut with her sisters Karla and Cicely, and her brother Kenneth. She has worked as a surgical instrumentalist, home care provider, candy factory worker, and telemarketer. She studied nursing at St. Francis Nursing School in New Castle, Pennsylvania, where she earned her degree. She went on to work as a clinical coordinator at Norwalk Hospital Surgical Center. She is of Panamanian descent.

Survivor 
Fields has participated in four different seasons of Survivor, and has even been praised by series host Jeff Probst for being a self-proclaimed couch potato who "got up off the couch to live their adventure".

Panama 
Fields first gained fame on Survivor: Panama — Exile Island. Originally cast as a member of Casaya, the tribe made up of the oldest women in the game, she was at risk of being the first one eliminated when her tribe lost the first Immunity Challenge. However, she used her persuasion skills to convince Melinda Hyder and Ruth-Marie Milliman to vote off Tina Scheer. When the four original tribes were contracted down to two, leaving only the La Mina and Casaya tribes in the contest, Fields was once again in the spotlight as one of the physically weakest competitors on the new Casaya tribe, but saved herself yet again on Day Six when Hyder was eliminated. Eventually, Fields was able to assimilate with her tribemates, and managed to make the merge.

With only four players in the game on Day 34, Danielle DiLorenzo and Terry Dietz teamed up to eliminate Fields after they were both sent to Exile Island by Aras Baskauskas, who would go on to win immunity on Day 36. Alone at camp, Fields and Baskauskas decided to vote out DiLorenzo (since Dietz probably had a hidden immunity idol and they did not want to risk it being used). Already predicting a draw and the subsequent fire-making challenge, Dietz coached DiLorenzo on starting a fire using flint, while Baskauskas did the same with Fields. At Tribal Council, the imminent tie vote happened and DiLorenzo and Fields were deadlocked at two votes each. The two faced off in the fire-making challenge where, using a flint and materials to support the fire (coconut shells, pieces of wood, straw, etc.), they were to create a bonfire high enough to burn through a rope. The first one to complete this task would survive, while the other would be sent to the jury. In this challenge, Fields lost and became the sixth member of the jury, placing fourth overall. In her final words following her elimination, Fields said that she was proud of having come so far in the competition.

At the Final Tribal Council, Fields voted for Baskauskas, over DiLorenzo, to win the prize of $1 million and the title of "Sole Survivor." During this season, Fields herself won a 2007 GMC Yukon pickup truck, for being voted most popular participant of the season by viewers.

Micronesia 
Two years after her first Survivor competition, Fields returned to the show for Survivor: Micronesia — Fans vs. Favorites, which premiered on February 7, 2008. She was initially assigned to Malakal, the tribe of "Favorites," or returning players, and initially floated between the two alliances within this tribe: one consisting of Ami Cusack, Eliza Orlins, Jonathan Penner and Yau-Man Chan; and the other consisting of Amanda Kimmel, James Clement, Oscar "Ozzy" Lusth and Parvati Shallow (with Jonny Fairplay also meandering between both alliances). Fields volunteered to be sent to Exile Island with Kathy Sleckman of Airai, the tribe of "Fans," or first-time players in the game, after Malakal won the combined Reward/Immunity Challenge in the Episode Two.

In the third episode of the season, she opted to join the alliance of Kimmel, Lusth, Clement, and Shallow after doubting the trustworthiness of Penner and Chan. On this occasion, Fields convinced her alliance to eliminate Chan, instead of Orlins, for being one of the biggest threats in the game. In Episode Four, Fields remained secure since her tribe had won Immunity. By the fifth episode, the original tribes were switched and Fields ended up in the new Malakal tribe, formed by four Fans and four Favorites.

After the merge, Fields became part of the "Black Widow Brigade," an all-female alliance consisting of herself, Kimmel, Shallow, Natalie Bolton, and Alexis Jones. After the merge, she concocted a plan to take Ozzy out due to him being a physical threat and possessing an immunity idol. Cirie, along with Natalie, Alexis, Parvati, and Jason (who was slated to be eliminated) voted out Ozzy, subsequently blindsiding Amanda. This alliance was forced to vote out one of its own on Day 33, after the lone surviving outsider, Erik Reichenbach, won his second straight immunity. That night, Fields, joined the majority of the tribe in voting against Kimmel, but to everyone's surprise, Kimmel produced an immunity idol, which cancelled all the votes against her and sent Jones out of the game instead. On Day 36, Reichenbach won immunity yet again, but before Tribal Council, Fields came up with a plan to keep the Black Widows intact. She would try to trick Reichenbach into thinking that he was untrustworthy and that he needed to give his immunity to Bolton to earn back the jury's trust. Fields even went so far as to assure him that she and Bolton would join him in voting out Shallow if he gave up immunity. The plan worked, and Reichenbach gave his immunity necklace to Bolton right before the vote. Without immunity, Reichenbach was unanimously voted out.

At that point, Fields was confident that she was just one Tribal Council away from securing a spot in the Final Tribal Council. But on Day 38, following the elimination of Bolton, it was revealed that there would be one last immunity challenge followed by a Tribal Tribal Council, to decide who would get to plead their case to the jury in the Final Two. Kimmel went on to win final immunity, and Fields became the 18th person eliminated from Micronesia in third place as the eighth and final member of the jury as Kimmel felt that Fields was extremely hard to beat and would have a better chance of winning against Shallow. She would end up casting her final jury vote for Shallow to win the $1 million prize, and the title of "Sole Survivor," over Kimmel.

Heroes vs. Villains 
For the third time in her career, Fields was chosen to participate in Survivor, this time for its 20th season, Heroes vs. Villains. As part of the Heroes tribe, she immediately became targeted for elimination by Tom Westman and Stephenie LaGrossa, but survived the first Tribal Council when the Heroes tribe unanimously eliminated Jessica "Sugar" Kiper, who was seen as the weakest and most emotional person on the tribe. In Episode Two, Fields and her tribemate, Candice Woodcock, became the decisive votes in eliminating LaGrossa by a 6–3 margin.

In Episode Four, after being given a clue to a hidden immunity idol and believing that Westman had found it, Fields devised a plan to eliminate a member of the opposing alliance and eventually the Immunity Idol. She wanted to split the votes between Westman and Colby Donaldson, but she did not count on J.T. Thomas, who had eavesdropped on her plans. At Tribal Council, Thomas betrayed his alliance and helped eliminate Fields after Westman used his idol. She was the fourth person eliminated from the season, placing 17th overall.

Game Changers 
In 2017, Fields was featured in Survivor: Game Changers, her fourth time on the show. Initially placed on the Nuku tribe, she was eventually switched to the brand new Tavua tribe, then the Mana tribe, and finally, the merged Maku Maku tribe, making her the only player of the season to be on four different tribes. Following the merge, she aligned with Michaela Bradshaw. At the first post-merge Tribal Council, Bradshaw was targeted for elimination, but Fields managed to get Hali Ford voted out instead.

On Day 25, Fields struggled to finish the obstacle course featured in the reward challenge, but Jeff encouraged her to keep trying, and she eventually finished, albeit long after the challenge was decided. At that same challenge, Sarah Lacina had found a vote-stealer advantage hidden under a bench. A few days later, Lacina told Fields about this advantage. On Day 35, Lacina gave Fields custody of the advantage as a sign of trust, and Fields promised to give it back after Tribal Council was over. But at that night's Tribal Council, Fields tried to play the advantage, only to learn that it was non-transferable. Lacina, upset at Fields' attempt to usurp the advantage, immediately targeted Fields' ally Bradshaw, who was indeed voted out that night.

The following night, Brad Culpepper won immunity, and at Tribal Council, Fields joined Aubry Bracco and Tai Trang in voting against Lacina, while the rest of the tribe split their votes between Bracco and Trang. After the votes were cast, though, Trang played two idols: one for himself and one for Bracco. Lacina then played her Legacy Advantage, which gave her immunity at the Final Six. This prompted "Troyzan" Robertson to play his own immunity idol as well. In the end, Fields, being the only one without any immunity, became the first player ever to be eliminated by default, despite having no votes cast against her, and the fifteenth person eliminated from the game. She placed sixth overall and was the eighth member of the jury. At the Final Tribal Council, she voted for Lacina to win the $1 million prize over Culpepper and Robertson.

Legacy
On December 12, 2011, Fields was inducted into Xfinity's Survivor Hall of Fame. In a 2011 Rob Has a Podcast community fan poll, Fields was ranked the 6th greatest contestant of all-time. In a 2014 follow-up poll, she was ranked 7th. In a 2015 issue of CBS Watch magazine, commemorating the 15th anniversary of Survivor, she was voted by viewers as the tenth greatest contestant in the history of the series to date. In total, she has played the game of Survivor a total of 121 days, making her one of only a handful of players to have passed the 100-day mark on Survivor.

In 2016, she appeared in a special episode of The Price Is Right which featured multiple former Survivor contestants competing on the show.

When all twenty contestants of Survivor: Winners at War were asked to name the best player to have never won Survivor, Fields received the most support, with six winners choosing her: Parvati Shallow, Natalie Anderson, Adam Klein, Yul Kwon, Boston Rob Mariano, and Nick Wilson.

Other media appearances 

In 2016, Fields appeared on a Survivor themed episode of The Price is Right. 

Fields was a contestant on the 2022 USA Network reality competition series Snake in the Grass alongside her former Heroes vs. Villains tribemate, Stephenie LaGrossa Kendrick. Fields split the $100,000 prize with Big Brother and The Amazing Race alums Janelle Pierzina and Rachel Reilly after they correctly determined that LaGrossa Kendrick was the Snake. 

In 2023, she competed on the Peacock reality TV series The Traitors, on a cast that again included LaGrossa Kendrick and Reilly. Chosen to play as a traitor, she received the entire $250,000 prize pool for being the only traitor remaining at the end of the game.

Personal life

Fields is married to Clarencio "H.B." Hacker, and together, they live with her three children: John, Jamil, and Jared.

Filmography

Television

References

External links
 Official CBS biography page (2006)

1970 births
African-American television personalities
American nurses
American women nurses
Living people
People from Jersey City, New Jersey
People from Norwalk, Connecticut
Survivor (American TV series) contestants
21st-century African-American people
21st-century African-American women
20th-century African-American people
20th-century African-American women
Reality show winners